Walter Burnett Jr. has served as the alderman for Chicago's 27th ward since his first election in 1995. The 27th ward includes the West Loop, Greektown, East Garfield Park, Near North Side, Old Town, West Humboldt Park, West Town, Goose Island and the Illinois Medical District.

Early life and education 
Walter Burnett, Jr. was born August 16, 1963 at Cook County Hospital in the Illinois Medical District. Burnett served two years in jail for armed bank robbery in Kankakee.

Political career 
Burnett had an 11-year career working for the Cook County government, where he had a variety of jobs including working as special assistant to Jesse White who was then Cook County Recorder of Deeds. Burnett later worked on Jesse White's campaign for Illinois Secretary of State.

Aldermanic career 
Despite a 1993 Illinois state law that barred those convicted of a felony from holding local office, in 1995 Burnett ran for alderman in the newly redistricted 27th ward. Burnett defeated Dexter Watson, a protege of Rickey R. Hendon who had been appointed to succeed Hendon after Hendon's election to the Illinois Senate. Burnett has subsequently been reelected in 1999, 2003, 2007, 2011, 2015, and 2019.

In 2018, J.B. Pritzker appointed Burnett to the gubernatorial transition's Restorative Justice and Safe Communities Committee.

Ahead of the 2011 Chicago mayoral election, Burnett was one of several black Chicago political figures involved in talks to have three black contenders choose a "consensus" black candidate to rally around. These talks led Congressman Danny Davis and State Senator James Meeks to withdraw from the election and endorse the candidacy of Carol Moseley Braun, a former United States Senator and ambassador, as the "consensus" black candidate. In the runoff of the 2019 Chicago mayoral election, Burnett endorsed Toni Preckwinkle against Lori Lightfoot. In the initial round of the 2023 Chicago mayoral election, Burnett endorsed Mayor Lori Lightfoot for reelection. After Lightfoot was eliminated in the 2023 election's first round, Burnett endorsed Paul Vallas in the runoff.

Personal life 
Alderman Burnett is married to Darlena Williams-Burnett. Williams-Burnett was appointed as a Cook County commissioner from the 1st district, being appointed after Danny K. Davis resigned in 1997 to serve in the United States Congress. She lost in her attempt to win a full term in 1998. Williams-Burnett challenged incumbent congressman Danny K. Davis in the February, 2010 Democratic primary and lost.

References

External links 
 Chicago's 27th Ward website of Friends of Walter Burnett Jr, Burnett's political action committee

1963 births
21st-century American politicians
Chicago City Council members
Living people
Northeastern Illinois University alumni
University of Illinois Chicago alumni